Blue Creek Township is one of the twelve townships of Paulding County, Ohio, United States.  The 2000 census found 804 people in the township, 506 of whom lived in the unincorporated portions of the township.

Geography
Located in the southern part of the county, it borders the following townships:
Paulding Township - north
Jackson Township - northeast corner
Latty Township - east
Hoaglin Township, Van Wert County - southeast corner
Union Township, Van Wert County - south
Tully Township, Van Wert County - southwest corner
Benton Township - west
Harrison Township - northwest corner

Two villages are located in Blue Creek Township: Haviland in the eastern part of the township, and part of Scott in the southeastern part of the township along the border with Van Wert County.

Name and history
It is the only Blue Creek Township statewide.

Government
The township is governed by a three-member board of trustees, who are elected in November of odd-numbered years to a four-year term beginning on the following January 1. Two are elected in the year after the presidential election and one is elected in the year before it. There is also an elected township fiscal officer, who serves a four-year term beginning on April 1 of the year after the election, which is held in November of the year before the presidential election. Vacancies in the fiscal officership or on the board of trustees are filled by the remaining trustees.

References

External links
County website

Townships in Paulding County, Ohio
Townships in Ohio